The Alma-Seidler-Ring was created in 1978 by the Austrian government as the female counterpart of the Iffland-Ring. Similar to that ring, the holder, or bearer, of the Alma-Seidler-Ring is considered to be the "most significant and most worthy actress of the German-speaking theatre", in the opinion of the previous holder who has passed it to her by will.

The ring is named after the Austrian actress Alma Seidler (1899–1977). According to the widow of Werner Krauss, holder of the Iffland-Ring from 1954–1959, he would have preferred to pass the ring to Seidler, had tradition not prevented him from willing it to a woman.

Bearers of the Alma-Seidler-Ring

References

Further reading 
 Bernhard A. Macek: Alma Seidler. Österreichs Jahrhundertschauspielerin. My Morawa, Wien 2018, .

External links 
 Wiener Newspaper of 15 November 2000

German awards
German theatre awards
Individual rings